Osmavandan (also Romanized as ‘Os̄māvandān; also known as Usmamanda) is a village in Jirdeh Rural District, in the Central District of Shaft County, Gilan Province, Iran. At the 2006 census, its population was 759, in 216 families.

References 

Populated places in Shaft County